Jerome Atkinson is an English karateka.  He is the winner of multiple European Karate Championships and World Karate Championships Karate medals.

References

Black British sportspeople
English male karateka
Wadō-ryū practitioners
Year of birth missing (living people)
Living people